Charles Joseph Amphlett Taylor (8 December 1878 – 25 August 1960) was an Australian rules footballer who played with Melbourne, Carlton and St Kilda in the Victorian Football League (VFL).

Notes

External links 
		
Charlie Taylor's profile at Blueseum

1878 births
Australian rules footballers from Melbourne
Melbourne Football Club players
Carlton Football Club players
St Kilda Football Club players
1960 deaths
People from Collingwood, Victoria